The 16th Army Corps was an Army corps in the Imperial Russian Army.

Composition
41st Infantry Division
45th Infantry Division
47th Infantry Division
5th Cavalry Division

Part of
4th Army: 1914 - 1915
2nd Army: 1915
4th Army: 1915
7th Army: 1915 - 1917
8th Army: 1917

Commanders  
 12.01.1897 — 01.01.1903 : Mikhail Batyanov
 05.03.1911 — 17.03.1911 : Leonid Artamonov
 31.03.1911 — 13.10.1914 : Platon Geisman
 13.10.1914 — 13.12.1915 : Vladislav Klembovsky
 13.12.1915 — 08.10.1916 : Sergei Savvich
 16.10.1916 — 02.04.1917 : Vladimir Dragomirov
 02.04.1917 — 10.09.1917 : Nikolai Stogov

References 

 

Corps of the Russian Empire